Luro or Lygra is an island in Alver Municipality in Vestland county, Norway. The  island sits in the Lurefjorden which cuts into the Lindås peninsula. There is one road on the island that continues over a short bridge onto the mainland. The bridge was built in 1972. The island has been the site of Lygra Church since the Middle Ages. There are Viking Age tombstones that are still standing on the island. The Heathland Centre is located on Lygra. It is an information centre about the cultural landscape in this coastal area.

See also
List of islands of Norway

References

Islands of Vestland
Alver (municipality)